Matthew Moody (born 23 September 1985) is an Australian rules footballer in the Australian Football League.

He was recruited as the number 23 draft pick in the 2003 AFL draft from South Fremantle in the West Australian Football League. He made his debut for the Brisbane Lions in Round 6, 2005 against Essendon. 

Moody struggled with leg injuries in 2007 and 2008, and was eventually delisted by the Lions at the conclusion of the 2008 season. However he was later cleared to train with Fremantle in preparation for potential drafting by another club for 2009.

References

External links

WAFL playing statistics

1985 births
Living people
Brisbane Lions players
South Fremantle Football Club players
Perth Football Club players
Australian rules footballers from Western Australia